The Volcano School refers to a group of non-native Hawaiian artists who painted dramatic nocturnal scenes of Hawaii's erupting volcanoes.  Some of the artists also produced watercolors, which, by the nature of the medium, tended to be diurnal.  At their best, these paintings exemplify a fusion of the European Sublime aesthetic, Romantic landscapes, and the American landscape traditions.  Two volcanoes on the Island of Hawaii, Kilauea and Mauna Loa, were intermittently active during the 1880s and 1890s, when interest in Volcano School paintings peaked. Getting to Kilauea, the more frequently painted volcano required an arduous two- or three-day roundtrip journey on horseback.  

Printmaker and art educator Huc-Mazelet Luquiens called this period "a little Hawaiian renaissance".

Members
Jules Tavernier (French 1844–1889) was arguably the most important Volcano School painter.  Other artists include Ernst William Christmas (Australian 1863–1918), Constance Fredericka Gordon Cumming (Scottish 1837–1924), Charles Furneaux (American 1835–1913), D. Howard Hitchcock (American 1861–1943), Ogura Yonesuke Itoh (Japanese 1870–1940), Ambrose McCarthy Patterson (Australian 1877–1966), Titian Ramsey Peale (American 1799–1885), Louis Pohl (American 1915–1999), Eduardo Lefebvre Scovell (British 1864–1918), William Pinkney Toler (American 1826–1899), William Twigg-Smith (New Zealander 1883–1950), Joseph Dwight Strong (American 1852–1899) and Lionel Walden (American 1861–1933).

A selection of Volcano School paintings is usually on display at the Honolulu Museum of Art.

Related work
Although the American landscape painter Frederic Edwin Church produced similar paintings of Ecuador’s Cotopaxi Volcano during and after visits in 1853 and 1857, he is not considered a member of this group and he never visited the Hawaiian Islands.

Selected works

References
 Forbes, David W., "Encounters with Paradise: Views of Hawaii and its People, 1778–1941", Honolulu Academy of Arts, 1992, 173–199.
Honolulu Academy of Arts, "Mt. Kilauea, the House of the Everlasting Fire", Calendar News, Honolulu Academy of Arts, Mar. /Apr. 2005.
Maier, Steven, "Jules Tavernier: Hawaii’s First Real Painter", Honolulu, Nov. 1996, 80.
 Severson, Don R. Finding Paradise: Island Art in Private Collections, University of Hawaii Press, 2002, 88–114.

Footnotes

 
-
American art movements
-
Hawaiiana
Hawaii art